Strmec pri Polenšaku is a small settlement in the Municipality of Dornava in northeastern Slovenia. It lies at the edge of the Slovene Hills east of Dornava and south of Polenšak. The area is part of the traditional region of Styria. It is now included with the rest of the municipality in the Drava Statistical Region.

Name
The name of the settlement was changed from Strmec to Strmec pri Polenšaku in 1953.

References

External links
Strmec pri Polenšaku on Geopedia

Populated places in the Municipality of Dornava